Mark of the Succubus is an original English-language manga created by Tokyopop's Rising Stars of Manga 3 runner-up winners, Irene Flores and Ashly Raiti. The first volume became available in October 2005, the second was released in November 2006, and the third was released in July 2008.

Synopsis
Mark of the Succubus revolves around Aiden Landis, a normal 17-year-old boy, mild-tempered and indecisive, who's never certain about what he wants for himself. His father wants him to be a lawyer while his girlfriend wants him to change for her own social desires. His teachers are all convinced that he could be a top student if he'd only stop daydreaming. Aiden just wants to play his guitar and, perhaps, write a meaningful song. Then he meets Maeve, a succubus-in-training.

Maeve is a young succubus who hasn't yet gotten her license. She goes down to the human world nervously, enthralled by all she sees there- especially art and a certain teenaged human named Aiden Landis, who seems just as infatuated with her as she is with him. Maeve soon meets Aiden's quirky best friend, Devin, and his snobby, superficial girlfriend, Sandra, and learns about the wonders and perils of the human world.

However, things may not go as smoothly as planned for Maeve. There is a demon on her tail who will do anything in her power to catch Maeve breaking the Rules of the demonworld, all in order to increase her own wealth and social status. What's more, Maeve must decide whom to place her deadly Mark upon—the Mark that inhabits the body of the first human she will kill.

She's not sure how to dress, or talk, or act around humans—and what's more, she isn't sure that she'd like to seduce and kill one. Which could prove a difficulty for her, as that is exactly the reason that she's being sent to mingle with humans in the first place. And when she ends up falling in love with the same mortal that she's placed her Mark on, sentencing him to die, only trouble can result from such a blatant breaking of demon law.

Characters
Maeve
Age: 17
Hair: Black
Eyes: Purple
Classification: Succubus
Intent and studious, but a little absentminded, Maeve tends to stand out among demons and humans alike. Her quirky habits mark her as someone just learning the ways of a culture, and her utter inability to lie convincingly adds to the peculiar image. Despite her training, she often forgets what she's meant to be doing among the humans and loses herself in the fun of the moment.

Aiden Landis
Age: 17
Hair: Dark Brown
Eyes: Green
Indecisive, mild-tempered, and a bit withdrawn, Aiden rarely protests when others make his decisions for him, drifint along in whateverdirection he's pushed with no real enthusiasm. Al he really wants to do is play guitar but only his best friend knows he's good at it: instead he puts a weak effort into things he doesn't truly care about, avoiding conflict at the expense of his own dreams.

Sandra

Veril
Age: 965
Hair: Auburn
Eyes: Grey
Classification: Incubus
For most, Veril is a walking paradox. He has no qualms about seducing and killing humans, blackmailing superiors, or playing dirty to get his own way. At the same time however he has a strong sense of justice, and is fiercely loyal to those very few that are close to him. When his peculiar sense of is added to the mix, the incubus often comes across as a puzzle that is nearly impossible to figure out.
Veril is an older brother/father figure to Maeve, whom he took in as his own when she was an infant or toddler. He cares deeply for her and will go to extreme lengths to keep her safe.

Devin Wilshire
Age: 17
Hair: Blonde
Eyes: Brown
Loud and quite purposefly obnoxious to anyone he doesn't like,  Devin is considered something of an oddball including those closest to him. His love of science fiction and conspiracy theories has left more than one person wondering whether his somewhat far-fetched personal conjectures are real or just for fun

Sylne
Age: 1129
Hair: Silver-Blue
Eyes: Turquoise
Classification: Succubus
Charming, intelligent, and collected, there isn't much about Sylne not to like - on the surface, at least. Underneath, the woman's hand is always in some sort of scheme, and she's willing to sacrifice even those closest to her in an effort to gain more power. She's two-faced and underhanded, two very good things for a succubus to be.
Desiring a certain title, and the power, fortune, and recognition that comes with it, Sylne placed an illegal Human Spell on the Imp, Junael, forcing him t spy on her old student, Maeve, expecting the girl's nature would cause the younger succubus to slip just enough to use for her own selfish purposes.
Sylne is the top succubus in Erebus, a title she inherited from the prior top succubus (whose death Sylne arranged), and once had an intimate relationship with Veril but they grew apart.

Junael
Age: 212
Hair: Black
Eyes: Reddish-Brown
Classification: Imp
Animal Form: Crow
Somewhat reserved, Junael is the sort who prefers to handle things behind the scenes. He's meticulously neat and pays close attention to detail; usually, he knows more about any given situation than he lets on. though his work requires him to make sure the rules are followed, he's found that knowing them well enough allows them to be bent when the time clls for it. 
He becomes a pawn of Sylne who places on him illegal Human Magic to control him, and he's forced to spy on Maeve, looking for any slip-ups or breaking the rules. He turns on Sylne and aids Maeve.

Release
Written by Ashly Raiti and illustrated by Irene Flores, Mark of the Succubus was published by  Tokyopop in three volumes from November 8, 2005, to July 9, 2008. Madman Entertainment distributes the series in Australia and New Zealand. The series is also licensed in Finland by Pauna Media Group.

Volume list

References

External links
The official Mark of the Succubus site
Mark of the Succubus at Tokyopop's website
IGN's review of volume 1.
Ain't It Cool News' review of volume 2.
The Santa Maria Sun's interview with the creators.
Newsarama's interview with the creators.

2005 comics debuts
Horror comics
Romance comics
Succubi in popular culture
Tokyopop titles